The following is a list of prominent people who were born in the U.S. state of Utah, live in Utah, or for whom Utah is a significant part of their identity.

A

Maurice Abravanel – music director of the Utah Symphony for over 30 years
Maude Adams – Broadway stage actress of late 19th and early 20th centuries, noted for title role in Peter Pan
Florence E. Allen – first woman to serve on a state Supreme Court, second to serve as a federal judge
Quinn Allman – guitarist for The Used
John Amaechi – American-English NBA player for the Utah Jazz (2001–2003), sports broadcaster, political activist
Rocky Anderson – former mayor of Salt Lake City
David Archuleta – singer-songwriter, runner-up on the seventh season of American Idol
Leonard J. Arrington – historian
Hal Ashby – director; films include Being There, The Last Detail, Harold and Maude

B

Simon Bamberger – first Democratic governor of Utah; only Jewish governor of Utah
 Dean Baker (born 1958), macroeconomist
Lee Barnes (1906–1970) – pole vaulter, gold medalist in 1924 Olympics
Roseanne Barr – comedian, television actress, writer, talk-show host
Earl W. Bascom (1906–1995) – rodeo champion, inventor, artist, sculptor, Utah Sports Hall of Fame inductee
Bruce Bastian – computer programmer, co-founder of WordPerfect company, philanthropist, on the board of directors of the Human Rights Campaign
Zane Beadles – lineman for the Jacksonville Jaguars
Linda Bement (1942–2018) – Miss USA and Miss Universe 1960
Robert Foster "Bob" Bennett – Republican United States Senator from Utah
Ezra Taft Benson – 13th president of the Church of Jesus Christ of Latter-day Saints, 1985–1994; United States Secretary of Agriculture
Jaime Bergman – actress, model, 1999 Playboy Playmate
Arnie Beyeler – first base coach for the Boston Red Sox
Don Bluth (born 1937) – animator
Frank Borzage – film director and actor
Reva Beck Bosone – Utah's first woman member of Congress
Elaine Bradley – musician; member of rock band Neon Trees
Shawn Bradley – former NBA center, one of the tallest players in NBA history
Stewart Bradley – linebacker for the Philadelphia Eagles
Juanita Brooks – historian and author
John Moses Browning (1855–1926) – firearms designer
Val Browning (1895–1994) – business magnate, philanthropist, and gun innovator
John Buck (born 1980) – catcher for the Miami Marlins
Ted Bundy – serial killer who attended the S. J. Quinney College of Law (not born in Utah, but lived there)
Nolan Bushnell (born 1943) – video game designer, founder of Atari and Chuck E. Cheese's
Jerry Buss (1933–2013) – businessman, real estate investor and chemist, owned the Los Angeles Lakers

C

Ben Cahoon – slotback for the CFL's Montreal Alouettes, member of two Grey Cup championship teams in 2002 and 2009
Mario Capecchi (born 1939) – recipient, Nobel Prize in Physiology or Medicine, 2007
Orson Scott Card (born 1951) – science fiction author
Neal Cassady – writer; major figure of the Beat Generation of the 1950s and the psychedelic and counterculture movements of the 1960s; inspiration for the character Dean Moriarty in Jack Kerouac's novel On the Road
Butch Cassidy (1866 – c. 1908) – outlaw, born Robert LeRoy Parker in Beaver, Utah
Nick Clooney (born Nicholas Joseph Clooney, 1934) – journalist, anchorman, and television host; brother of singers Rosemary Clooney and Betty Clooney; father of actor and film director George Clooney
Stephen Covey (1932–2012) – author, The Seven Habits of Highly Effective People
Reed Cowan (born 1972) – television news anchor, philanthropist, and documentary filmmaker
Melvin A. Cook (1911–2000) – explosives expert, chemist
Chris Cooley (born 1982) – NFL tight end
Chandler Cox (born 1996) – NFL fullback

D

Matthew Davis – actor, The Vampire Diaries, What About Brian, Legally Blonde
Laraine Day – actress, Foreign Correspondent, Mr. Lucky, The High and the Mighty
Jordan Devey – offensive guard for the San Francisco 49ers
Paul W. Draper – anthropologist, mentalist, educator
Christine M. Durham – Chief Justice of the Utah Supreme Court since 2002

E

David Eccles – industrialist
Marriner Eccles – banker, economist, Chairman of the Federal Reserve during Roosevelt and Truman Administrations
Spencer Eccles – bank executive for First Security and Wells Fargo
Lily Eskelsen García – vice president of National Education Association
Richard Paul Evans – author, known for novel The Christmas Box
Henry Eyring – theoretical chemist who proposed theories on which future Nobel Prize winners based their work

F

Philo T. Farnsworth (1906–1971) – inventor of the electronic television
John D. Fitzgerald – author of The Great Brain series of children's books and Papa Married a Mormon
John F. Fitzpatrick – publisher of The Salt Lake Tribune 1924–1960
Harvey Fletcher – physicist, invented the hearing aid and audiometer; called "the father of stereophonic sound"
Brandon Flowers – singer for the rock band The Killers
Jim Fosgate – inventor of first car amplifier, Dolby Pro Logic II surround sound, founder of Rockford Fosgate electronics
Jimmer Fredette – professional basketball player
Patrick Fugit (born 1982) – actor, known for lead role of Cameron Crowe's film Almost Famous
Gene Fullmer (1931–2015) – middleweight boxer and world champion

G

John W. Gallivan – publisher of The Salt Lake Tribune, 1960–1984
Kendall D. Garff – founder of Ken Garff Automotive Group
Jake Garn – former U.S. Senator and astronaut, the first member of Congress in space
Anthony Geary – actor in several daytime television series
John Gilbert – silent film star
Tyler Glenn – musician; member of rock band Neon Trees
Jared Goldberg (born 1991) – Olympic skier
Robert Gore – co-inventor of Gore-Tex fabrics
Wilbert L. Gore – co-inventor of Gore-Tex fabrics
Heber J. Grant (1856–1945) – 7th president of the Church of Jesus Christ of Latter-day Saints
Tom Green – Mormon fundamentalist and practicer of plural marriage
Riley Griffiths – actor, known for Super 8

H

Gregg Hale – guitarist for British band Spiritualized
Tracy Hall (1919–2008) – scientist
Jacob Hamblin – peace maker with Native Americans
Orrin Hatch (born 1934) – long-time U.S. Senator from Utah since 1977
Dan Hausel (born 1949) – martial-arts grandmaster, exploration geologist and author
Stanley Havili (born 1987) – fullback for the Philadelphia Eagles
Colin Haynie (born 2004/2005) — alleged mass shooter
Katherine Heigl – actress (Grey's Anatomy, 27 Dresses)
Gary R. Herbert (born 1947) – Governor of Utah
Jared and Jerusha Hess (born 1979, 1980) – filmmakers (Napoleon Dynamite)
Tracy Hickman – writer, co-creator of the D&D campaign setting Dragonlance and associated novels
Esther Hicks – inspirational speaker and best-selling author
Chelsie Hightower – professional ballroom dancer on So You Think You Can Dance and Dancing with the Stars
Joe Hill – socialist, radical labor activist, and member of the Industrial Workers of the World
Gordon B. Hinckley (1910–2008) – 15th president of the Church of Jesus Christ of Latter-day Saints, 1995–2008
Allison Holker – jazz dancer
Derek Hough and Julianne Hough – professional ballroom dancers on Dancing with the Stars
Jeph Howard (born 1979) – bassist for The Used
Jon Huntsman Jr. (born 1960) – Governor of Utah 2005–2009; ambassador to the People's Republic of China
Jon Huntsman Sr. – businessman, philanthropist, founder of Huntsman Corporation

I

Brian Ibbott – creator of the Coverville podcast

J

Daniel C. Jackling – founded the Utah Copper Co. in 1903, starting what became the world's largest open-pit mine
Ken Jennings – 74-time Jeopardy! champion
Jewel (born Jewel Kilcher, 1974) – singer-songwriter, guitarist, actress, and poet
Scott Johnson – creator of Extralife webcomic and podcast network Frogpants Studios
Megan Joy – singer, American Idol Season 8 finalist

K

Thomas Kearns – U.S. Senator from Utah (1901–1905), owned the Silver King Coalition Mine in Park City and the Salt Lake Tribune, Utah's largest newspaper
Bryan Kehl – linebacker for the Washington Redskins
Brett Keisel – defensive end for the Pittsburgh Steelers
David M. Kennedy (1905–1996) – Treasury Secretary under President Nixon
Spencer W. Kimball – 12th president of the Church of Jesus Christ of Latter-day Saints; LDS President who ended the ban on priesthood for African-Americans in 1978
John F. Kinney – Chief Justice of the Utah Territory Supreme Court, 1853–1857, and the Territory of Utah's Delegate in the House of Representatives of the 38th Congress
Raymond Knight – rodeo organizer, son of mining magnate Jesse Knight
Steve Konowalchuk – NHL forward for Washington Capitals and Colorado Avalanche
Paul Kruger – linebacker for Cleveland Browns

L

Carnell Lake (born 1967) – former NFL professional football player, football coach
Paul Langton – actor
Joi Lansing – model, actress
LeafyIsHere - YouTuber
Mike Leavitt – former Governor of Utah, Secretary of Health and Human Services
Harold B. Lee – 11th president of the Church of Jesus Christ of Latter-day Saints
John D. Lee – early LDS Church leader, the only man convicted in the Mountain Meadows massacre
Trevor Lewis – forward for NHL's Los Angeles Kings
Don L. Lind – astronaut
Mike Lookinland – actor
Star Lotulelei – defensive tackle for the Carolina Panthers
Brandon Lyon – relief pitcher for MLB's Toronto Blue Jays

M

Maddox – Internet satirist and author of The Best Page in the Universe and The Alphabet of Manliness
Karl Malone – professional basketball player (retired); two-time NBA MVP and Hall of Famer
John Willard Marriott – founder of worldwide hotel business Marriott International, Inc.
Mark Maryboy – politician and a former Navajo Nation Council Delegate
Scott M. Matheson – Governor of Utah
Ned Mathews – running back for Detroit Lions and Boston Yanks
Bert McCracken – lead singer of the band The Used
Roger I. McDonough – Chief Justice of the Utah Supreme Court, 1947–1948 and 1954–1959
David O. McKay – 9th president of the Church of Jesus Christ of Latter-day Saints
James B. McKean – congressman, Chief Justice of the Utah Territory Supreme Court, 1870–1875
Jim McMahon – NFL football player (retired); businessman; motivational speaker
Evan Mecham – 17th Governor of Arizona
Kieth Merrill – Academy Award-winning producer and director
Johnny Miller – former professional golfer, won 25 PGA Tour events, current golf analyst for NBC Sports
Larry H. Miller (1944–2009) – businessman, philanthropist, owner of Utah Jazz basketball team
Gerald R. Molen – Academy Award-winning film producer
Thomas S. Monson – president of the Church of Jesus Christ of Latter-day Saints
Ted Moss – three-term Democratic senator from Utah
Barry Mower – businessperson, owner of Lifetime Products
Brandon Mull – best-selling author

N

Jim Nantz – CBS Sports anchor
David Neeleman – co-founder JetBlue
Russell M. Nelson – current president of The Church of Jesus Christ of Latter-day Saints
Haloti Ngata – defensive end for the Baltimore Ravens
Claude Nowell (1944–2008) – founder of Summum religion and philosophy

O

Dallin H. Oaks – lawyer, jurist, Apostle of the Church of Jesus Christ of Latter-day Saints
Darcy Olsen – president and chief executive officer of the Goldwater Institute
Merlin Olsen (1940–2010) – former NFL football player, actor on Little House on the Prairie and star of NBC's Father Murphy
Osmond family – family music group The Osmonds
Alan Osmond (born 1949) – singer
Donny Osmond (born 1957) – singer, actor, television host
Jay Osmond (born 1955) – singer
Jimmy Osmond (born 1963) – singer, actor, businessman
Marie Osmond (born 1959) – singer, actress, television host
Merrill Osmond (born 1953) – singer
Wayne Osmond (born 1951) – singer
Wayne Owens (1937–2002) – attorney, U.S. Congressman from Utah

P

Erik Pears (born 1982) – offensive tackle for the San Francisco 49ers
Utah Phillips (1935–2008) – folk singer, poet, and labor organizer
Dorothy Poynton (1915–1995) – diver, two-time Olympic gold medalist
Ivy Baker Priest (1905–1976) – United States Secretary of the Treasury 1953–61
Pat Priest (born 1936) – actress, The Munsters

R

Melba Rae – actress, Search for Tomorrow
Natacha Rambova – costume and set designer; Egyptologist
Cal Rampton – Utah governor, 1965–1977; won three terms running as a Democrat
Carmen Rasmusen (born 1985) – contestant on American Idol 2
Dallas Reynolds – offensive lineman for the New York Giants
Dan Reynolds - lead singer for the band Imagine Dragons
Gary Ridgway – serial killer known as the Green River Killer
Amanda Righetti – actress, The Mentalist, North Shore, Reunion
Mitt Romney – politician, businessman, former Governor of Massachusetts (2003–2007), 2012 Republican nominee for president, and United States Senator from Utah (2019-)
Karl Rove – political advisor to President George W. Bush
Ron Rydalch – defensive lineman for the Chicago Bears

S

Matt Salmon – U.S. Representative from Arizona
Kyle Sampson – former Chief of Staff and Counselor for United States Attorney General Alberto Gonzales
Brandon Sanderson – author, selected to complete Robert Jordan's fantasy series The Wheel of Time
Cael Sanderson – wrestler from Heber City, Utah, gold medalist in the 2004 Summer Olympics
Daniel Schaffer – mentalist
Harold Schindler (1929–1998) – Utah historian
Dalton Schultz – tight end for the Dallas Cowboys
Byron Scott – NBA shooting guard; head coach for the New Jersey Nets, New Orleans Hornets, and Cleveland Cavaliers
Brent Scowcroft – National Security Advisor to presidents Gerald Ford and George H. W. Bush
Ryan Seaman – drummer in the rock band Falling in Reverse
Jerry Sloan – basketball player, Hall of Fame head coach for the Utah Jazz; longest-tenured coach in American professional sports
Elizabeth Smart – kidnapped as a girl from her bedroom in Salt Lake City in 2002; child safety activist
George Albert Smith – 8th president of the Church of Jesus Christ of Latter-day Saints
Joseph Fielding Smith – 10th president of the Church of Jesus Christ of Latter-day Saints
Lucky Blue Smith (born 1998) – model and drummer
Reed Smoot – U.S. Senator, served almost thirty years in Congress, ten as chairman of the Finance Committee
Wallace Stegner – historian, novelist, short story writer, and environmentalist
Branden Steineckert – former drummer of The Used, drummer for Rancid
Stanley Smith Stevens – psychologist; founded Harvard's Psycho-Acoustic Laboratory; credited with Stevens' power law
John Stockton – Hall of Fame point guard for the Utah Jazz, holds the NBA records for career assists and steals
Picabo Street – champion alpine ski racer with the U.S. Ski Team
Xavier Su'a-Filo – guard for the Dallas Cowboys
Bruce Summerhays – professional golfer; mission president for the Church of Jesus Christ of Latter-day Saints
Jane Summerhays – actress
George Sutherland – English-born American jurist and political figure; Associate Justice of the Supreme Court, 1922–1938
Kelly Sweet – adult contemporary singer
May Swenson (1913—1989) – poet
Sril Art – artist

T

Naufahu Tahi – former NFL fullback
Mitch Talbot – pitcher for the Samsung Lions
Chrissy Teigen – model for the Sports Illustrated Swimsuit Issue
Kip Thorne – theoretical physicist
D. J. Tialavea – tight end for the Atlanta Falcons
Will Tukuafu – fullback for the Seattle Seahawks

U

Harvey Unga – running back for the Chicago Bears
Brendon Urie – singer-songwriter, frontman of Panic! at the Disco

V

Craig Venter – biotechnologist, biochemist, geneticist, and entrepreneur
Zach Vigil – linebacker for the Miami Dolphins

W

Wakara – Native American; leader of the Timpanogos tribe
Olene S. Walker – governor
Tom Wallisch – skier (King of Afterbang)
Sam Walton – Wal-Mart founder, served in the military at Ft Douglas
John Warnock – co-founder of Adobe Systems Inc.
Dallon Weekes – musician, singer-songwriter; bassist of American rock band Panic! at the Disco
Mike Weir – professional golfer
Rhyan White – Olympic swimmer
Willie Wilkin – professional football player
Terry Tempest Williams – author, environmentalist
Marie Windsor – actress
Mary Elizabeth Winstead – actress, Live Free or Die Hard
Dave Wolverton – author
James Woods – film, stage and television actor
David Wright – cyclist, stage winner in all three grand tours, yellow jersey holder, national time trial champion

Y

Brigham Young – 2nd president of the Church of Jesus Christ of Latter-day Saints
Bryan Young – filmmaker and author
Loretta Young – film actress and television star
Mahonri Young – sculptor and artist
Steve Young – Hall of Fame quarterback for the San Francisco 49ers, NFL's Most Valuable Player 1992 and 1994

Z

Charles S. Zane – Chief Justice of the Utah Territory Supreme Court (1884–1888), and of the Utah Supreme Court (1896–1899)
Michael D. Zimmerman – sensei; Chief Justice of the Utah Supreme Court, 1994–1998

See also

By educational institution affiliation

 List of Brigham Young University alumni
 List of Brigham Young University faculty
 List of University of Utah people
 List of Utah State University alumni
 List of Utah State University faculty

By governmental office

 List of governors of Utah
 List of justices of the Utah Supreme Court
 List of United States representatives from Utah
 List of United States senators from Utah

By location

 List of people from Salt Lake City

By occupation

 List of Utah artists
 List of Utah suffragists
 List of Utah writers

By religious affiliation

 List of Latter Day Saints

References

Lists of people from Utah